Roman Mstislavich (– 19 June 1205), also known as Roman the Great, was a Rus’ prince and a member of the Rurik dynasty.

He was Prince of Novgorod (1168–1170), Volhynia (1170–1189, 1189–1205), and of Halych (Galicia; 1189, 1198/99–1205). By seizing the throne of Halych, he became the master of all Western Rus’. In the early 13th century, Byzantine chroniclers applied the imperial title "autocrate" (αύτοκράτωρ) to him, but there is no evidence that he assumed it officially.

He waged two successful campaigns against the Cumans, from which he returned with many rescued captives. The effect of Roman's victory was, however, undermined by new divisions among the princes of Rus’.

Roman died in a battle with the Poles at the Battle of Zawichost. He founded the Romanovich dynasty, which would rule Volhynia and Halych until 1340.

Early years 
He was the eldest son of Mstislav Izyaslavich, Prince of Volhynia at that time, and Agnes, a daughter of Duke Bolesław III of Poland.

Mstislav, who had previously occupied Kiev, sent Roman to Novgorod on 14 April 1168, after the Novgorodians had expelled their prince, Svyatoslav IV Rostislavich. However, Svyatoslav's brothers the princes of Smolensk, and Prince Andrey Yuryevich of Vladimir, who had supported Svyatoslav's rule in Novgorod, spent the rest of the year conspiring and forming alliances against Mstislav. After Mstislav died in August 1170, the Novgorodians expelled Roman and invited Andrey to be prince. Andrey sent Ryurik Rostislavich to rule Novgorod.

Prince of Volhynia 
When his father died, Roman was bequeathed the Principality of Volhynia. He subdued the Yotvingians and harnessed the captives to pull the plows on his estates instead of oxen.

He married Predslava Ryurikovna, a daughter of Ryurik Rostislavich, who had followed him in Novgorod. Their eldest daughter, Fedora Romanovna, was married to Vasilko Vladimirovich, a grandson of Prince Yaroslav Volodimerovich Osmomysl of Halych, but Vasilko later repudiated her.

Following the death of Yaroslav Osmomysl on 1 October 1187, trouble began in the Principality of Halych, due to the strife between his two sons, Oleg and Vladimir. Roman urged the Galicians to evict Vladimir and make himself their prince, but they failed to either expel or kill Vladimir. However, when the Galicians threatened to kill his wife, Vladimir took her and fled to King Béla III of Hungary (1172–1196). According to a late chronicle, Oleg was appointed by Duke Casimir II of Poland (1177–1194) to rule the Principality of Halych, but the Galicians poisoned him and invited Roman to be their prince. When accepting their offer, Roman gave his patrimony of Volhynia to his brother, Vsevolod Mstislavich.

But Béla marched against Roman, intending to reinstate Vladimir, and the Hungarians seized the principality. Instead of returning Halych to Vladimir, Béla proclaimed his own son, Andrew, its ruler. Roman was forced to flee to Volhynia, but Vsevolod refused him entry. He therefore went to the Poles for help, but when they refused as well. Finally Roman rode to his father-in-law, Ryurik Rostislavich, in Belgorod and solicited military aid from him. Nonetheless, the Hungarian troops repelled his attack. Ryurik did help Roman drive his brother Vsevolod out of Volhynia and reclaim his patrimony.

Meanwhile, Vladimir succeeded in escaping from his dungeon in Hungary, and in 1190 Duke Casimir II sent Polish troops to the Principality of Halych to support his claims. At the approach of the expedition, the boyars rose up against the Hungarians and expelled the unpopular Andrew. Vladimir asked his uncle Prince Vsevolod III Yuryevich of Vladimir to support his rule. Vsevolod Yuryevich demanded that all the Rus’ princes, Roman among them, pledge not to challenge Vladimir in Halych, and they agreed.

On 17 May 1195, Roman's father-in-law Grand Prince Ryurik allocated domains in the Kievan lands to the princes in Monomakh's dynasty, and Roman received Torchesk, Trypillia, Korsun, Bohuslav, and Kaniv. Vsevolod Yuryevich, however, threatened to wage war when he learnt of the allocations. Therefore, Roman agreed to relinquish the towns in exchange for comparable domains or a suitable payment in kuny. Ryurik gave the five towns to Vsevolod Yuryevich, who in turn handed over Torchesk to his son-in-law Rostislav, the brother of Roman's wife Predslava. On learning that his brother-in-law had received Torchesk, Roman accused his father-in-law of having contrived to give the town to his son from the very start. Ryurik warned Roman that they could not afford to alienate Vsevolod Yuryevich because all the princes in Monomakh's dynasty recognized him as their senior prince.

Roman refused to be mollified and conspired against his father-in-law, turning to Prince Yaroslav II Vsevolodovich of Chernigov, who agreed to join him. When Ryurik learnt that Roman had persuaded Yaroslav to seize Kiev, he informed Vsevolod Yuryevich. Fearing retribution, Roman rode to the Poles, where he was wounded in battle, and he was forced to ask Ryurik Rostislavich for clemency. Metropolitan Nikifor reconciled the two princes, and Ryurik gave Roman the town of Polonyy (southwest of Kamianets) and a district on the Ros’ River.

In the autumn of 1196, Roman ordered his lieutenants to use Polonyy as their base for raiding the domains belonging to his father-in-law's brother, Prince David Rostislavich of Smolensk, and son, Prince Rostislav Rurikovich of Torchesk. Ryurik retaliated by sending his nephew, Prince Mstislav Mstislavich of Trepol, to Vladimir Yaroslavich of Halych, instructing him to join Mstislav Mstislavich in attacking Roman's lands. Accordingly, Vladimir and Mstislav razed Roman's district around Peremil, while Rostislav and his forces attacked Roman's district near Kamianets. At about that time, Roman initiated his repudiation his wife Predslava, Ryurik's daughter, and began threatening to confine her to a monastery.

Prince of Halych and Volhynia 
In 1198 (or 1199), Vladimir died, creating a political vacuum that a number of claimants were eager to fill. Ryurik could now claim that after the dynasty of Halych became defunct, the territory reverted to the jurisdiction of the prince of Kyiv; the princes of both branches of the Olgovichi (the princes of Chernigov) could argue that their marriage ties with the defunct dynasty gave them the right to rule Halych; and the Hungarians had already made a bid for the domain ten years earlier. The Galicians asked Ryurik for his son Rostislav, but Roman rode to Duke Leszek I of Poland (1194–1227), promising to be at his beck and call if the Polish ruler helped him win Halych. When the citizens refused to welcome Roman, Leszek besieged the principality, and after capturing it he forced its residents to accept Roman as prince. Roman promised to be subservient to the duke of Poland and to live in peace with his new subjects.

Roman turned his attention to the Cumans, who were threatening Byzantine interests in the Balkan Peninsula, and agreed to come to the aid of Emperor Alexios III Angelos (1195–1203). This dealt a severe blow to the nomads. In 1200, Roman married the Byzantine princess Anna-Euphrosyne, daughter of Emperor Isaac II Angelos. This tie with Byzantium helped stabilize Galicia's relations with the Rus’ population of the Lower Dniester and Lower Danube.

Shortly thereafter, Roman began wreaking havoc on domains belonging to Ryurik Rostislavich and other princes. In 1201, Ryurik summoned the Olgovichi to campaign against Roman. Roman pre-empted their attack by rallying the troops of his principality; the Monomashichi and the Black Caps also joined him. The Kievans opened the gates of the podol’ to Roman. He forced Ryurik and the Olgovichi to capitulate; he gave Kiev, with the consent of Vsevolod III Yuryevich, to Prince Ingvar Yaroslavich of Lutsk.

However, Ryurik and the Olgovichi re-captured Kiev on 2 January 1203. Roman asked Vsevolod to broker peace with the Olgovichi, and after he had done the same, on 16 February 1203 he marched against Ryurik in Ovruch. Ryurik submitted to Roman and Vsevolod and promised to sever relations with the Olgovichi and the Cumans. Roman also advised him to ask Vsevolod to reinstate him in Kiev and promised to support his request. Consequently, Vsevolod forgave Ryurik and reappointed him to the town.

That winter Ryurik, Roman, and other princes attacked the Cumans and took many captives. They later met at Trypillia to allocate domains in accordance with the services that each prince had rendered in the defense of Rus’. But they quarreled, and Roman seized Ryurik, sent him to Kiev, and had him tonsured as a monk. He also forced Ryurik's wife Anna and daughter Predslava—his own wife whom he had repudiated—into a convent; and he took Ryurik's sons Rostislav and Vladimir Rurikovich with him to Halych.

Meanwhile, relations between Roman and Duke Leszek I of Poland had deteriorated for both religious and personal reasons. Leszek was a devout Roman Catholic, and it was probably at his suggestion that Pope Innocent III sent his envoys to Roman in 1204, urging him to accept Roman Catholicism and promising to place him under the protection of St Peter’s sword. Roman’s answer, as recorded in the Radziwiłł Chronicle, was characteristic enough: pointing to his own sword, he asked the envoys, “Is the Pope’s sword similar to mine? So long as I carry mine, I need no other.”

Leszek and his brother Duke Konrad I of Masovia undertook a sudden campaign against Roman, who was caught unaware and killed in the first battle at Zawichost.

According to another version of the story, Roman wanted to expand his realm at the expense of Poland and died in an ambush while entering Polish territory.

Marriage and children
1. Predslava Rurikovna, a daughter of Grand Prince Ryurik Rostislavich of Kiev and his wife, Anna Yuryevna of Turov
Fedora Romanovna (?–after 1200), wife of Vasilko Vladimirovich of Halych;
Elena Romanovna (or Maria Romanovna) (?–after 1241), wife of Prince Mikhail Vsevolodovich of Chernigov
(?) Salomea Romanovna (?–before 1220), wife of Duke Swantopolk I of Pommerellen, her mother is uncertain;
2. (1197/1200): Anna-Euphrosine, a relative of Emperor Isaac II Angelos
King Daniel Romanovich of Halych (1201/1202–1264)
King Vasylko Romanovich of Halych (1203/1204–1269)

See also

 List of Russian rulers
 List of Ukrainian rulers
 List of people known as The Great

Footnotes

Sources
Dimnik, Martin: The Dynasty of Chernigov - 1146-1246; Cambridge University Press, 2003, Cambridge; .
Subtelny, Orest: Ukraine: A History; University of Toronto Press, 2000, Toronto, Buffalo & London; 
Vernadsky, George: Kievan Russia; Yale University Press, 1948, New Haven and London; .

1150s births
1205 deaths
People from Galicia–Volhynia
Romanovichi family
Piast dynasty
Princes of Halych
Princes of Novgorod
12th-century princes in Kievan Rus'
13th-century princes in Kievan Rus'
Eastern Orthodox monarchs
Year of birth uncertain